The Franciscan Friars of Killarney is a 1911 American silent documentary produced by Kalem Company. It was directed by Sidney Olcott.

Production notes
The film was shot in Beaufort, co Kerry, Ireland, during summer of 1911.

References
 Michel Derrien, Aux origines du cinéma irlandais: Sidney Olcott, le premier oeil, TIR 2013.

External links

 The Franciscan Friars of Killarney website dedicated to Sidney Olcott

1911 films
American silent short films
Films set in Ireland
Films shot in Ireland
Films directed by Sidney Olcott
American black-and-white films
American documentary films
1911 documentary films
1910s American films